Sputnik is the alias of a Swedish lo-fi musician who has been involved in numerous solo projects, most notably, Weatherday.

History 
Sputnik started attempting producing music around 2015 before releasing their debut album, Come In, on Bandcamp under the name Weatherday in 2019. After gaining underground popularity, the album was re-released on Topshelf Records.

Personal life 
Sputnik reveals little about their personal life on social media or in interviews. They are non-binary and attracted to all genders.

Discography

Albums 
 Come In (2019)

EPs 
 Weatherglow (2022), with Asian Glow
 Edema Ruh (2022)

References 

Swedish musicians

Year of birth missing (living people)
Living people